Airblue Limited (stylized as airblue) is a private Pakistani airline with its head office on the ground floor of the Islamabad Stock Exchange (ISE) Towers in Islamabad, Pakistan. Airblue operates scheduled domestic and international flights, the latter to Saudi Arabia and the United Arab Emirates.

History 
The airline was established in 2003 by Tariq Chaudhry, a Pakistani-American IT professional. Airblue started operations on 18 June 2004 with three leased Airbus A320-200 aircraft serving Karachi–Lahore, and Karachi–Islamabad with three daily flights in each direction. The airline was inaugurated in 2004 by Prime Minister Zafarullah Khan Jamali.

During the first year the airline became very popular, which allowed the airline to compete directly with the flag carrier Pakistan International Airlines and the two other private carriers, flying more than 400,000 passengers in the first year with a load factor of over 90%. This allowed the airline to expand into more cities in Pakistan including Peshawar, Quetta and Nawabshah.

On 14 August 2005 Airblue launched its first international flight from Karachi to Dubai. On June 4, 2007, Airblue launched its inaugural flight to Manchester using the Airbus A321.

Airblue changed its IATA code from ED to PA in June 2012, the new code originally belonged to the defunct and once iconic carrier Pan American World Airways. In 2011 the airline launched service to Istanbul’s Sabiha Gokcen Airport - a route that was ultimately terminated.

In June 2012, Airblue finalised an agreement to acquire one Airbus A320 and two leased A340-300s for existing and new international routes. It was also looking at various types of turboprop aircraft for new domestic routes but this plan was eventually dropped. The A340s joined the fleet in October 2012, enabling the airline to strengthen its Manchester route with nonstop flights as well as launch a second UK destination Birmingham in September 2013 and connect both stations with Lahore. The A340s later also flew to the Middle East. Technical issues related to the aircraft eventually led to them being phased out by January 2014; they had been leased for a five-year term. UK operations also ended with Birmingham being dropped after just three months' service and Manchester ending in January 2014.

Destinations

Airblue serves the following destinations as of August 2018, the list also includes former routes.

Services

Cabin 

All aircraft in the fleet have a 3-by-3 layout in an all-economy cabin; and have overhead video screens. Airblue formerly had a business class section but dropped it due to exogenous economic factors.

eTicketing 
Airblue was the first airline in Pakistan to introduce e-ticketing, wireless check-in, and self-check-in kiosk facilities. The airline also uses Sabre, a ticket distribution system.

Frequent flyer program 
The Airblue frequent flyer program is called "Blue Miles". Passengers start at the base level where sign-up is free. Once passengers earn enough miles, there are upgrades to the Blue Card followed by the Platinum Card. In May 2009, the airline allied with Faysal Bank to offer credit cards.

Lounges 
Airblue inaugurated its premium lounge at Jinnah International Airport, Karachi in November 2008. It has since been closed. Named the Blue Lounge International, it was designed for business class passengers, credit card holders, and privileged customers. The lounge offered Internet facilities, cable television, newspapers and magazines, massage chairs, and a snack bar. It was located in the international terminal of the airport.

Cargo operations 
Airblue has launched an e-Cargo service to cater to air freight markets of Pakistan, the United Arab Emirates, and the United Kingdom. According to a press release, e-Cargo will broaden the base of cargo and permit certified agents to book freight directly online opening the inventory through Web.

Fleet

Current fleet

As of December 2022, the Airblue fleet consists of the following aircraft.

Former fleet

Accidents and incidents

 On July 28, 2010, Airblue Flight 202, flying a domestic route from Karachi to Islamabad with 146 passengers and 6 crew on board crashed into the Margalla Hills. Radio contact with the aircraft was lost at approx. 09:45 local time. All 152 passengers and crew on board the aircraft were killed in the crash. The aircraft involved was an Airbus A321-200 registered as AP-BJB.
 On 23 April 2019, an A320, registered AP-EDA and operating PA613 from Sharjah to Peshawar suffered a runway excursion on landing. The aircraft stopped beyond the end of the runway, but still on paved surface. No injuries were reported.

Partnerships
Airblue currently has a partnership with PepsiCo. Airblue had a contractual partnership with the Ukrainian Windrose Airlines for a three-year wet-lease of some Windrose aircraft. These aircraft carried the Windrose livery with Windrose crew and a mixture of Windrose and Airblue cabin crew. This wet-lease expired in 2016.

See also 

 List of airlines of Pakistan
AirSial
SereneAir
 Fly Jinnah

References

Citations

Bibliography
Schmitz, Sebastian. "airblue: A New High Flyer from Pakistan". Air International, January 2006, Vol 70 No 1. pp. 56–58. ISSN 0306-5634.

External links 

 Official website

Airlines of Pakistan
Airlines established in 2003
Companies based in Islamabad
Pakistani brands
Pakistani companies established in 2003